Wayne High School is a public high school located in Bicknell, Wayne County, Utah. The school serves grades 9-12.

References

External links
Wayne School District website

Public high schools in Utah
Schools in Wayne County, Utah